On October 31, 2015, a shooting occurred near downtown Colorado Springs, Colorado. The shooting began around 8:45 a.m., though a 911 call was placed 10 minutes earlier on the morning of Saturday, October 31, which was Halloween. Three people were randomly shot and killed by a gunman, later identified as 33-year-old Noah Harpham, as they were walking down Prospect Street near downtown Colorado Springs. A man riding a bicycle was the first victim shot after pleading for his life, according to eyewitness reports. The gunman then turned and ran, killing two women. These women were either killed randomly as the gunman ran down the street, firing at random or sitting on a porch targeted by the gunman. The gunman was later killed in a shootout with four police officers in which he was struck once. In total, there were three crime scenes. This was the first of two shootings in Colorado Springs in less than a month; the second was the Planned Parenthood mass shooting, 28 days later.

Perpetrator 
33-year old Noah Harpham used a DPMS Classic 16, an AR-15 style semi-automatic rifle, to kill victims. Harpham was also armed with a Ruger SP101 .357  Magnum revolver and a Springfield Armory XD-M 9mm pistol, although it does not appear that either pistol was used in any of the shootings. All three guns were legally purchased in 2009. No motive was found for the shooting, and no apparent warning signs existed, despite a video and blog posted days earlier in which Harpham complained about his parents and family life.

Victims 
Andrew Alan Myers, 35, was the first person killed by Harpham. He was the bicyclist who crossed Harpham's path. Christy Galella, 34, and Jennifer Vasquez, 42, were residents of the Platte House, a shelter for women recovering from drug and/or alcohol addiction. One of the women died in the house's doorway while the other was killed on the house's porch. None of the victims appeared to have connections to Harpham.

Criticism of police response 
A 911 call was placed ten minutes before Harpham began shooting, as a neighbor reported Harpham walking around carrying a rifle and gas cans. Colorado is an open carry state, so the 911 operator dispatched only one officer who was later called off to respond to a disturbance that "threatened human life" at a senior home. No other officers were available to respond so the operator terminated the call. Four minutes later, the same caller called back to report Myers' death. There was nationwide outrage that the 911 operator did not do enough to prevent the shooting, but the department insisted the operator followed protocol. Many, including Colorado activist group Colorado Ceasefire, called on the city to ban open carry, though the mayor insisted they would not.

See also
 Colorado Springs shooting (disambiguation)
 List of shootings in Colorado

References

External links
 Colorado gunman who killed 3 posted blog before rampage from the New York Daily News via YouTube

2015 in Colorado
2015 active shooter incidents in the United States
2015 murders in the United States
Deaths by firearm in Colorado
Events in Colorado Springs, Colorado
Mass shootings in Colorado
Mass shootings in the United States
October 2015 events in the United States